Baderban (also Romanized as Baderbān) is a village in Hojr Rural District, in the Central District of Sahneh County, Kermanshah Province, Iran. At the 2006 census, its population was 422, in 108 families.

People 
The village people are Shi'a Muslims and some of the people of this village are descendants of Musa al-Kadhim. Some Baderban people live in Kermanshah city. In baderban, people speak Kurdish. Baderban is the gatekeeper of 108 households.

Monuments 
Tepe Sarab Baderban
Tepe Musa Baderban
Tepe Baderban

References 

Populated places in Sahneh County